Stuart 'Statz' Dearden (born 1 August 1990, in Edinburgh) is a Scottish former football player and current assistant coach of Edinburgh University AFC.

Career
Dearden previously played for youth sides Edina Hibs and Salvesen Boys Club while at Portobello High School. He attracted the attention of Dunfermline Athletic and signed a contract when he was 16, playing for the Under 19s and reserve sides before making his debut as a substitute against Queen of the South on the final day of the 2007–08 season.

In January 2009, Dearden was loaned to Forfar Athletic of the Scottish Third Division until the end of the 2008–09 season. After his release from Dunfermline, Dearden signed for Scottish Lowland side Edinburgh University AFC, where he played for 4 years before becoming a coach for the first-team squad in 2013.

References

External links

Living people
1990 births
Dunfermline Athletic F.C. players
Forfar Athletic F.C. players
Scottish Football League players
Footballers from Edinburgh
Association football defenders
People educated at Portobello High School
Scottish footballers